Goris Airport, also known as Shinuyar Airport or Shinuhayr Airport is located to the south of Goris, near the village of Shinuhayr, Syunik Province, Armenia. It has been closed since the collapse of the USSR in 1991. However, the Armenian government plans on reconstructing the airport and opening it to public and private service by 2019.

See also

 List of airports in Armenia
 List of the busiest airports in Armenia
 Transport in Armenia

References

Airports built in the Soviet Union
Airports in Armenia
Buildings and structures in Syunik Province